This is a list of the butterflies of family Hesperiidae, or the "skippers", which are found in Europe. It is a part of the list of the butterflies of Europe.

Subfamily Hesperiinae
Zeller's skipper, Borbo borbonica  (Boisduval, 1833) 
Mediterranean skipper, Gegenes nostrodamus (Fabricius, 1793) 
Pigmy skipper, Gegenes pumilio (Hoffmansegg, 1804) 
Silver-spotted skipper, Hesperia comma ( Linnaeus, 1758) 
Large skipper, Ochlodes sylvanus ( Esper, 1777) 
White branded swift, Pelopidas thrax (Hübner, 1821) 
Lulworth skipper, Thymelicus acteon (Rottemburg, 1775) 
Thymelicus christi Rebel, 1894 uncertain taxonomic status
Levantine skipper, Thymelicus hyrax  (Lederer, 1861) 
Essex skipper, Thymelicus lineola (Ochsenheimer, 1808) 
Small skipper, Thymelicus sylvestris (Poda, 1761)

Subfamily Heteropterinae
Chequered skipper, Carterocephalus palaemon (Pallas, 1771) 
Northern chequered skipper, Carterocephalus silvicola Meigen, 1829 
Large chequered skipper, Heteropterus morpheus (Pallas, 1771)

Subfamily Pyrginae
Mallow skipper, Carcharodus alceae (Esper, 1780)
Southern marbled skipper, Carcharodus baeticus (Rambur, 1839) 
Tufted skipper, Carcharodus floccifera (Zeller, 1847) 
Marbled skipper,  Carcharodus lavatherae (Esper, 1783) 
Oriental skipper, Carcharodus orientalis Reverdin, 1913
Stauder's skipper, Carcharodus stauderi Reverdin, 1913
False mallow skipper, Carcharodus tripolina (Vérity, 1925)
Inky skipper, Erynnis marloyi (Boisduval, 1834)
Dingy skipper, Erynnis tages (Linnaeus, 1758)
Spinose skipper, Muschampia cribrellum (Eversmann, 1841)
Sage skipper, Muschampia proto (Ochsenheimer, 1808)
Tessellated skipper, Muschampia tessellum (Hübner, 1803)
Large grizzled skipper, Pyrgus alveus (Hübner, 1803)
Alpine grizzled skipper, Pyrgus andromedae (Wallengren, 1853)
Oberthür's grizzled skipper, Pyrgus armoricanus (Oberthür, 1910)
Foulquier's grizzled skipper, Pyrgus bellieri (Oberthür, 1910) 
Dusky grizzled skipper, Pyrgus cacaliae (Rambur, 1839)
Carline skipper, Pyrgus carlinae (Rambur, 1839)
Safflower skipper, Pyrgus carthami (Hübner, 1813)
Alpine checkered skipper, Pyrgus centaureae (Rambur, 1839)
Sandy grizzled skipper, Pyrgus cinarae (Rambur, 1839)
Cinquefoil skipper, Pyrgus cirsii (Rambur, 1839)
Grizzled skipper, Pyrgus malvae (Linnaeus, 1758)
Southern grizzled skipper, Pyrgus malvoides (Elwes & Edwards, 1897)
Rosy grizzled skipper, Pyrgus onopordi (Rambur, 1839)
Olive skipper, Pyrgus serratulae (Rambur, 1839)
Yellow-banded skipper, Pyrgus sidae (Esper, 1784)
Warren's skipper, Pyrgus warrenensis (Vérity, 1928)
Hungarian skipper, Spialia orbifer (Hübner, 1823)
Persian skipper, Spialia phlomidis (Herrich-Schäffer, 1845)
Spialia rosae Hernández-Roldán, Dapporto, Dinca, Vicente & Vila, 2016
Red underwing skipper, Spialia sertorius (Hoffmansegg, 1804)
Spialia therapne (Rambur, 1832)

References
Higgins, L.G. & Riley, N.D. (1970). A Field Guide to the Butterflies of Britain and Europe. Collins 
Higgins, L.G., (1975). The Classification of European Butterflies. London, Collins, 320 pp. 
Kudrna O., Ed. Butterflies of Europe. Aula Verlag, Wiesbaden 8 volumes
Tshikolovets, V.V. Butterflies of Europe and Mediterranean Area. Tshikolovets, Kiev 

 
Europe, Hesperiidae